The Château de Mauriac is a château in Dordogne, Nouvelle-Aquitaine, France. It is listed as a Monument historique.

Characteristics 

The Château de Mauriac is in the department of the Dordogne,  to the north-west of the town of Douzillac. It overlooks the railway line from Coutras to Tulle and the River Isle, below the Mauriac dam. The dam used to drive a mill providing energy to a furniture factory, now replaced by a small hydroelectric power plant. It is private property, but the gardens and terrace are open to visitors.

The château is located on the eastern border of a park, bounded by two towers at the south-west and north-west.

Access to the castle is via a partly-ruined gatehouse.

The chateau's appearance from the south-east is that of a lodge flanked by two wide round towers, all with machicolation.

History 
The château itself was built in the 15th and 16th centuries. It replaced a mediaeval structure, which itself replaced one from the Gallo-Roman period.

On his return from Italy, Michel de Montaigne made a stop at the château in 1581.

The château was given the title of a monument historique on 12 October 1948, and the entire site on 10 February 2016.

References

Gallery

Châteaux in Dordogne
Monuments historiques of Dordogne